Komsomolsk or The Frozen North (also known a City of Youth) is a 1938 Soviet drama film directed by Sergei Gerasimov. Made by Lenfilm, it is a propaganda work set against the backdrop of the construction of the new city of Komsomolsk. Although the film portrays this as the work of the Young Communist volunteers, it was in reality built largely by Gulag prisoners.

Cast
 Pyotr Aleynikov as Pyotr  
 Sergei Gerasimov
 Yevgeniya Golynchik as Cossack Woman  
 Bari Haydarov as Kilia  
 Leonid Kmit 
 Stepan Krylov as Subotin 
 Nikolay Kryuchkov as Andrei Sazanov  
 Viktor Kulakov as Chekanov  
 Ivan Kuznetsov as Butsenko  
 Tamara Makarova as Natasha Solovyeva  
 Aleksandra Matveeva as Klavka  
 Zula Nakhashkiyev as Kilia's Father  
 Ivan Novoseltsev as Vladimir Solovyev  
 A. Polibin as Organizer of Construction 
 G. Shenov as Mavrin  
 Valentina Telegina as Motya  
 Pavel Volkov as Stepan Nikitich  
 Georgi Zhzhyonov

References

Bibliography 
 Anna M. Cienciala, Wojciech Materski & N. S. Lebedeva. Katyn: A Crime Without Punishment. Yale University Press, 2008.

External links 
 

1938 films
Soviet drama films
1938 drama films
1930s Russian-language films
Films directed by Sergei Gerasimov
Soviet black-and-white films